John Warwick Huggins (2 June 1886 – 26 April 1915) was an English professional footballer who played in the Football League for Sunderland as an outside left. He also played in the Southern League for Reading.

Personal life 
Huggins attended St. James’ National School, Whitehaven and Bede College, Durham. He later worked as a teacher and while a footballer with Reading, he taught at Swansea Road School. In May 1909, he was appointed a certified assistant at Wheatley Hill Boys Secondary School.

A pre-war member of the Bede College company in the Durham Light Infantry, Huggins re-enlisted as a private in the regiment soon after Britain's entry into the First World War. He was killed on or near Gravenstafel Ridge during the Second Battle of Ypres on 25–26 April 1915. After being initially buried by the Germans in a cemetery in Wallemolen, Belgium, Huggins' remains were moved to Perth (China Wall) Cemetery after the war.

Career statistics

References

1886 births
1915 deaths
People from Eden District
Footballers from Cumbria
English footballers
English Football League players
Association football outside forwards
Leadgate Park F.C. players
British Army personnel of World War I
Durham Light Infantry soldiers
British military personnel killed in World War I
Sunderland A.F.C. players
Reading F.C. players
Durham City A.F.C. players
Northern Football League players
Southern Football League players
Schoolteachers from Cumbria
Burials at Perth (China Wall) Commonwealth War Graves Commission Cemetery